As a consequence of former American and, also earlier for a short period, British sovereignty over the islands that are now the Philippines, there are many places in the country with English names.  

English has been one of the country's two official languages since independence from the United States in 1946. As a result, many place names have either been translated to or given new English names. The name Philippines is itself anglicised from the islands' Spanish name, Filipinas.

Province
Mountain Province

Municipalities
Adams, Ilocos Norte
Allen, Northern Samar (named after American military governor Robert Allen.)
Boston, Davao Oriental (named after the American city of Boston.)
Brooke's Point, Palawan (named after the British ruler of Sarawak James Brooke.)
Conner, Apayao (named after American governor Norman Conner.)
General MacArthur, Eastern Samar (named after the American general Douglas MacArthur.)
Jones, Isabela (named after American legislator William Atkinson Jones.)
Lakewood, Zamboanga del Sur (named after American governor general Leonard Wood.)
MacArthur, Leyte
New Washington, Aklan (named after the first U.S. president George Washington.)
Saint Bernard, Southern Leyte (named after Saint Bernard.)
Taft, Eastern Samar (named after the U.S. president and former civil governor William Howard Taft.)
Turtle Islands, Tawi-Tawi

Barrios and districts

 Addition Hills
 Barangay Pittland
 Bay City
 Brookspoint
 Clark Freeport Zone
 Camp John Hay
 Camp O'Donnell
 Eastwood City
 Forbes Park
 Greenhills, San Juan
 Newport City
 Rockwell Center
 Triangle Park
 Veterans Village

Islands
Crocodile Island
Fortune Island (from the Spanish origin "Isla de Fortun")
Hundred Islands (from the Spanish origin "Las Cien Islas")
White Island

Mountains and volcanoes
Cleopatra Needle 
Mount Leonard Kniaseff
Mount Parker
Mount Victoria
Mount Saint Paul
Smith Volcano
Sleeping Beauty Mountain
Thumb Peak

Lakes
Alligator Lake
Lake Ernestine
Lake Leonard
Lake Wood

Highways and roads
This is not an exhaustive list.
Airport Road
Andrews Avenue
Annapolis Street
Commonwealth Avenue
Connecticut Street
Congressional Avenue
Dalton Pass
East Avenue
Elliptical Road
F.B. Harrison Street
Fields Avenue
Gilmore Avenue
Governor's Drive
Kennon Road
Lawton Avenue
MacArthur Highway
McKinley Road
New York Street
North Avenue
Pioneer Avenue
Roosevelt Avenue
Session Road
Shaw Boulevard
Taft Avenue
United Nations Avenue
Wilson Street
Wyoming Street

References

See also
 List of Philippine provincial name etymologies
 List of Philippine city name etymologies
 List of Philippine place names of Spanish origin

English
Philippine
History of the Philippines (1898–1946)
Philippine English